Auten is the surname of several people:

 Christine Auten (born 1969), American voice actress
 Harold Auten (1891–1964), British naval officer and Victoria Cross recipient
 Phil Auten (1840–1919), American business executive and co-owner of the Pittsburgh Pirates baseball team

See also
 AUTEN-67, an autophagy-enhancing drug candidate